Lepic is a surname of French origin. Notable people by that name include:

 Ludovic-Napoléon Lepic (1839–1889), French artist, archaeologist and patron of the arts. 
 Ermin Lepić, (known as Lepa) is a Bosnian volleyball player.
 Louis Lepic (1765-1827), French cavalry commander of the French Revolutionary and Napoleonic Wars.
 Hugues Lepic (born 1965), private equity professional and investor.

French culture